A partial lunar eclipse took place on Thursday, July 26, 1934.

Visibility

Related lunar eclipses

Half-Saros cycle
A lunar eclipse will be preceded and followed by solar eclipses by 9 years and 5.5 days (a half saros). This lunar eclipse is related to two annular solar eclipses of Solar Saros 125.

See also
List of lunar eclipses
List of 20th-century lunar eclipses

Notes

External links

1934-07
1934 in science